Rashad Jamal Jones-Jennings (born August 31, 1984) is an American professional basketball player. He last played for Pioneros de Quintana Roo.

Early life
Jones-Jennings was born in Chattanooga, Tennessee to Valentina Jones and is one of five children, the other four are sisters. He attended Howard School of Academics and Technology. While playing for the school's basketball team, he helped guide them to three district championships, two regional championships and two appearances in the state tournament while averaging 10 points and 12 rebounds per game. He graduated in 2002 with a 3.3 GPA.

College career

Chattanooga State CC
Rather than head right off to a four-year college or university out of high school, Jones-Jennings stayed in Chattanooga and attended Chattanooga State Community College (CSCC) for two years. As a  power forward / center, he earned all-conference honors in both seasons. During his sophomore year, his final at CSCC, he averaged 16.3 points and 14.0 rebounds per game. His rebounding effort ranked second nationally. Jones-Jennings earned many accolades, including NJCAA Division I Third-Team All-American honors, the TJCAA and Eastern Division Most Valuable Player awards, as well as spots on the All-TJCAA and All-Eastern Division teams.

Arkansas–Little Rock
After a standout junior college career, Jones-Jennings was awarded an athletic scholarship to play basketball at the University of Arkansas at Little Rock. He spent his junior and senior seasons of NCAA eligibility playing for the Trojans. In his first season, he was dubbed the Sun Belt Conference Newcomer of the Year and a Third Team All-Conference selection after finishing the year ranked third nationally with 11.3 rebounds per game. This total also led the Sun Belt. On December 13, 2005 he became just the tenth NCAA Division I men's basketball player since 1973 to record 30 or more rebounds in a single game. He grabbed exactly 30 rebounds against in-state rival Arkansas–Pine Bluff. He was the first Division I player in six years and just the second since 1994 to accomplish the feat. Jones-Jennings had a great all-around impact in his first season at UALR as he led the team in rebounding, minutes played, minutes per game, blocked shots, total points, field goals made, free throws made and free throw attempts.

Entering his final college season in 2006–07, he was only one of eight returning players nationally to have averaged a double-double the year before. He also returned as the nation's top rebounder. Although the Trojans did not qualify for a postseason tournament in either of his two seasons, Jones-Jennings did garner much personal success, especially in his senior season. For the year, he recorded 18 double-doubles, 24 double-digit rebounding efforts and had three games with 20 or more rebounds, including a 25-point, 20-rebound performance against Texas State. He led Division I in rebounding on the year while averaging 13.1 per game in 30 games played. He was also a First Team All-Conference selection as he would go on to finish his Division I career with 731 points and 475 rebounds in 59 career games.

Professional career
Despite a successful collegiate career, Jones-Jennings was not selected in the 2007 NBA Draft. He played for the Philadelphia 76ers in that summer's Las Vegas Summer League but did not make the final regular season roster. He then signed with Ago Rethimno Almeco in Greece in December, but ultimately did not play a game for them the entire season. Over the next two and a half years, Jones-Jennings became somewhat of a journeyman, playing professionally for teams in Germany, Ukraine, France and Mexico before ending up with Pure-Youth Construction Basketball Team in the Super Basketball League of Taiwan in December 2010. He signed with Osorno Básquetbol of the Chilean Liga Nacional Movistar for the 2013–14 season.

See also
List of NCAA Division I men's basketball players with 30 or more rebounds in a game
List of NCAA Division I men's basketball season rebounding leaders

References

External links
Draft Express profile

1984 births
Living people
American expatriate basketball people in Argentina
American expatriate basketball people in Chile
American expatriate basketball people in China
American expatriate basketball people in France
American expatriate basketball people in Germany
American expatriate basketball people in Mexico
American expatriate basketball people in Ukraine
American men's basketball players
Basketball players from Tennessee
BC Odesa players
Centers (basketball)
FC Bayern Munich basketball players
Junior college men's basketball players in the United States
Little Rock Trojans men's basketball players
Pioneros de Quintana Roo players
Power forwards (basketball)
Soles de Mexicali players
Sportspeople from Chattanooga, Tennessee
American expatriate basketball people in Taiwan
Pauian Archiland basketball players
Super Basketball League imports